Panaspis annettesabinae, also known as Sabin's snake-eyed skink, is a species of lidless skinks in the family Scincidae. It is endemic to Ethiopia. It is known from certainty only from its type locality near Bedele in the Oromia Region, southwestern Ethiopia, although there is a tentative record from central Ethiopia.

Etymology
This species is named after Annette Sabin, from the philanthropic Sabin family.

Habitat and distribution

Description
Panaspis annettesabinae measure  in snout–vent length.

References

Panaspis
Skinks of Africa
Reptiles of Ethiopia
Endemic fauna of Ethiopia
Reptiles described in 2020
Taxa named by Aaron M. Bauer
Taxa named by Robert Alexander Pyron